The 1907 Australasian Championships (now known as the Australian Open) was a tennis tournament played on Grass courts at Auchenflower in Brisbane, Australia. The event is a part of the Grand Slam. It was the third edition of the tournament and was held from 18 to 24 August 1907. Horace Rice won the singles title.

Finals

Singles

 Horace Rice defeated  Harry Parker 6–3, 6–4, 6–4

Doubles
 William Gregg /  Harry Parker defeated  Horace Rice /  George Wright 6–2, 3–6, 6–2, 6–2

References

External links
 Australian Open official Website

 
1907 in Australian tennis
1907
August 1907 sports events
1907 in New Zealand sport